Joel Gerezgiher (born 9 October 1995) is a German footballer who plays as an attacking midfielder for FC 08 Homburg. He was born in Frankfurt, Germany to Eritrean parents.

Career
Gerezgiher started his career in 2001 at the local club SV Niederursel and moved to the FSV Frankfurt academy in 2008. After four years in Bornheim he signed for the Eintracht Frankfurt U-19. For the 2014–15 season he signed a professional contract but did not play due to several injuries. In March 2015 Gerezgiher extended his Vertrag until 2018. On 8 August 2015, he made his first professional appearance during the 3–0 victory at Bremer SV in the first round of the DFB-Pokal. One week later he played his first Bundesliga match on 16 August 2015 when he was substituted for Marco Russ as Eintracht lost 1–2 at VfL Wolfsburg. He was loaned to FSV Frankfurt on 21 January 2016.

References

External links

1995 births
Footballers from Frankfurt
German people of Eritrean descent
Living people
German footballers
Association football midfielders
Eintracht Frankfurt players
FSV Frankfurt players
Holstein Kiel players
SG Sonnenhof Großaspach players
FC 08 Homburg players
Bundesliga players
2. Bundesliga players
3. Liga players
Regionalliga players
Oberliga (football) players